This is the discography of British pop group the New Seekers.

Albums

Studio albums

Live albums

Compilation albums

Singles

References

Discographies of British artists
Pop music group discographies